Mujibur Rahman Khan (23 October 1910 – 5 October 1984) was a Bangladeshi journalist, litterateur and politician.

Education and career
Khan passed the Entrance examination from Anjuman High School in 1928 and Bachelor of Arts in 1934 from Ananda Mohan College in Mymensingh.
He then enrolled in the Department of English at Calcutta University but left without completing his master's degree.

Career
Mujibur Rahman became a headmaster Harua High School in 24 Parganas.

Journalism
Khan was associated with All Bengal Anti-Fascist Writers' Guild, Bangiya Mussalman Sahitya Samiti, East Pakistan Renaissance Society, Pakistan Arts Council and Bulbul Lalitakala Academy.  He was the first president of East Pakistan Press Club which is today National Press Club.

East Pakistan Renaissance Society
At a meeting held on 30 August 1942 at the office of the Azad, in Kolkata, the East Pakistan Renaissance Society was established to promote the idea of a separate Muslim state comprising the Muslim majority areas of India on the basis of the Lahore Resolution. Abul Kalam Shamsuddin, Habibullah Bahar Chowdhury and Mujibur Rahman Khan became its founders. In 1944, Mujibur Rahman Khan published a booklet, Eastern Pakistan: Its Population, Delimitation and Economics along with Dr M Sadeq, a professor of economics at Islamia College. This contained a description of the government, economy, population, geographic boundary, security of a future state of East Pakistan. The society held its first meeting in July 1944. He was also elected to the first Constituent Assembly of India in 1946.

Works
 Bilate Pratham Bharatbasi (1939)
 Pakistan (1942)
 Eastern Pakistan: Its Population, Delimitation and Economics (1942)
 Sahityer Simana (1974)
 Sahitya O Sahityik (1971)
 Mahanabi (1980)
 Amader Itihas
 Sahityer Buniyad

Awards
 Sitara-i-Quaid-e-Azam
 Ekushey Padak (1980)

References 

1910 births
1984 deaths
Bangladeshi Muslims
20th-century Bengalis
Bangladeshi journalists
Recipients of the Ekushey Padak
20th-century journalists
People from Netrokona District